Daxata is a genus of longhorn beetles of the subfamily Lamiinae, containing the following species:

subgenus Daxata
 Daxata camelus Pascoe, 1864

subgenus Laodaxata
 Daxata lepesmei Breuning, 1961

subgenus Taxada
 Daxata anterufipennis Breuning, 1961
 Daxata confusa Pascoe, 1869
 Daxata laosensis Breuning, 1938
 Daxata sumatrensis Breuning, 1961
 Daxata ustulata Pascoe, 1866

References

Pteropliini